Corsiae or Korsiai was a town of ancient Greece on the island of same name. 

Its site is located near modern Petrokopio on the island of Fournoi.

References

Populated places in the ancient Aegean islands
Former populated places in Greece